Raúl Martínez Sambulá (born 14 March 1963) is a former Honduran professional football player, who made his name with the national team in the early 1990s.

Club career
Martínez Sambulá started his career at Olimpia and then moved abroad for a lengthy spell at Mexican side UA Tamaulipas. He returned to Honduras in 1994 to finish his career at Victoria. In April 1986 he helped set Francisco Adelmo Herrera's record of 7 successive clean sheets when he scored in the 30th minute of Herrera's 8th game.

International career
Martínez Sambulá made his debut for Honduras in the late 1980s and has earned a total of 28 caps, scoring no goals. He has represented his country in 9 FIFA World Cup qualification matches and played at the 1995 UNCAF Nations Cup, as well as at the 1991, and 1996 CONCACAF Gold Cups.

His final international was an August 1996 friendly match against El Salvador.

Managerial career
After he quit playing he went into management and was assistant to Honduras national coach Bora Milutinovic in 2004 and taking over for 5 matches after Bora's dismissal. In 2009, he became in charge of his former Mexican team UA Tamaulipas. He also managed Hispano and with Real Sociedad he won promotion to the national league in summer 2012, but was dismissed in November 2012 when results then went the wrong way. He has also managed Victoria, Platense, Vida and Olimpia.
In September 2013, Sambulá replaced Vladan Vicevic in the hot seat at Águila.

Personal life
Born to Marcos and Justina Martínez, Raúl was one of 12 children and five brothers who have played in the Honduran national league: Apollonio played at Atlántida, Olimpia and Atlético Portuario, Rudy at Universidad, Dagoberto played at Broncos and Fernando was part of Sula. There is even a sixth brother who played football, Mario, but he played in the second division with Curaçao. He is married to Mercy Yamileth and has three daughters with her and another before he got married.

Honours and awards

Club
C.D. Olimpia
Liga Profesional de Honduras (3): 1984–85, 1986–87, 1987–88

C.D. Victoria
Liga Profesional de Honduras (1): 1994–95

Country
Honduras
Copa Centroamericana (1): 1995

References

External links
 
 
 
 “Soy un esposo romántico”: Sambulá (Interview & profile) - Diez 

1963 births
Living people
People from Tela
Association football defenders
Honduran footballers
Honduras international footballers
1991 CONCACAF Gold Cup players
1995 UNCAF Nations Cup players
1996 CONCACAF Gold Cup players
C.D. Olimpia players
Correcaminos UAT footballers
C.D. Victoria players
Honduran expatriate footballers
Honduran expatriate sportspeople in Mexico
Expatriate footballers in Mexico
Liga Nacional de Fútbol Profesional de Honduras players
Liga MX players
Honduran football managers
Honduras national football team managers
Expatriate football managers in El Salvador
Copa Centroamericana-winning players
C.D. Águila managers